Gazzetta di Reggio is an Italian language daily newspaper published in Reggio Emilia, Italy. It has been in circulation since 1860.

History and profile
Gazzetta di Reggio was founded in 1860. The paper serves for the Emilia-Romagna region and is based in Reggio Emilia. It is part of the Espresso Group which also owns La Repubblica and various regional newspapers. The publisher is Finegil Editoriale S.P.A. The paper has an independent political stance.

The circulation of Gazzetta di Reggio was 14,000 copies in 2007. In 2013 the paper sold 10,841 copies. The Espresso Group reported that the circulation of the paper was 10,500 copies in 2014.

References

External links
 

1860 establishments in Italy
Daily newspapers published in Italy
GEDI Gruppo Editoriale
Italian-language newspapers
Newspapers established in 1860